The Merchant is a South Korean historical television drama, based on The Merchant of Joseon, a novel written by Choi In-ho (2000). It tells the story of Im Sang-ok (1779–1855), a legendary merchant who lived in the Joseon Dynasty.

The series is directed by Lee Byung-hoon and stars Lee Jae-ryong, Kim Hyun-joo, Jeong Bo-seok and Lee Soon-jae. It originally aired in 50 episodes from October 15, 2001, to April 2, 2002, Mondays and Tuesdays at 9:55 p.m. (KST) on MBC.

Cast

Main cast 
 Lee Jae-ryong as Im Sang-ok
 Maeng Se-chang as young Im Sang-ok
 Kim Hyun-joo as Park Da-nyung
 Jeong Bo-seok as Jung Chi-soo
 Lee Soon-jae as Park Joo-myung

Recurring cast 
 Park In-hwan as Hong Deuk-joo
 Hong Eun-hee as Mi-geum
 Han Hee as Jang Mi-ryung
 Kim Yoo-mi as Yoon Chae-yeon
 Song Jae-ho as Lim Bong-huk
 Na Moon-hee as Dama Han
 Lee Hee-do as Heo Sam-bo
 Jung Ho-keun as Jang Suk-joo
 Jung Ki-sung as Kim Sat-kat
 Lee Joo-hyun as Jang Myung-gook
 Kim Se-joon as Bok Tae
 Kim Yong-gun as Mo Ga-bi
 Lee Kye-in as Bae Soon-tak
 Park Jung-woo as Kim Dae-hwan
 Park Young-ji as Park Jong-kyung
 Jung Myung-hwan as Kim Doo-kwan
 Seo Bum-shik as Lim Jin-han
 Park Chan-hwan as Hong Dae-soo / Hong Kyung-rae
 Na Sung-kyoon as Kim Tae-chul
 Im Hyun-sik as Yang Soo-dong.
 Shin Gook as Hong Tae-joo
 Choi Ran as Woo Yeo-ran
 Maeng Sang-hoon as Steward Hwang
 Jun Soo-yeon as Lim Sang-hee
 Lee Ah-hyun as Cho Rae
 Jung Sun-il as Sunjo
 Lee Sook as Joo Mo

References

External links 
  

2001 South Korean television series debuts
2002 South Korean television series endings
Television series set in the Joseon dynasty
MBC TV television dramas
Korean-language television shows
South Korean historical television series
Television shows written by Choi Wan-kyu
Television shows set in North Pyongan Province